Nationality words link to articles with information on the nation's poetry or literature (for instance, Irish or France).

Events
June 4 – English publication of For a Song and a Hundred Songs: A Poet's Journey through a Chinese Prison by Liao Yiwu, recounting Yiwu's time following the Tiananmen Square protests of June 4, 1989, and the four brutal years he spent in jail for writing the poem "Massacre".
August 5 – PEN International's Writers in Prison Committee (WiPC) issues a call to action, demanding that the jailed 60-year-old Kazakh poet Aron Atabek be released from solitary confinement, where he has been since December 2012 and where he will continue to stay until the end of 2014. This is his punishment for writing The Heart of Eurasia, a blunt critique of President Nursultan Nazarbayev and his government. Atabek is currently serving an 18-year prison sentence for other alleged crimes against the state.
September 13 – Australians Graham Nunn and Andrew Slattery are accused of plagiarism over separate works which they have published.
September 21 – Ghanaian poet and diplomat Kofi Awoonor is among those who are killed in the Westgate shopping mall shooting in Nairobi, Kenya.
September 22 –  In the United Kingdom, poet C. J. Allen withdraws from the Forward Prize shortlist after admitting to plagiarism in some of his earlier work. He has been nominated in the category for "best single poem." Fellow poet Matthew Welton says he noticed last year that Allen had plagiarised some of his work.

Works published in English

Australia
Richard James Allen, Fixing the Broken Nightingale, Macau: ASM and Markwell: Cerberus Press – Flying Islands Books 
Peter Boyle, Towns in the Great Desert, Glebe: Puncher & Wattmann
Maree Dawes, brb, Sydney: Spineless Wonders
Diane Fahey, The Stone Garden: Poems from Clare, Melbourne: Clouds of Magellan
Luke Fischer, Paths of Flight, North Fitzroy: Black Pepper
Alan Gould, Capital, Glebe: Puncher and Wattmann, 2013
 Les Wicks, Sea of Heartbeak (Unexpected Resilience), Glebe: Puncher & Wattmann

Canada
Gwen Benaway, Ceremonies for the Dead
Jason Christie, Unknown Actor, Insomniac Press, London, ON
Barry Dempster, Invisible Dogs, Brick Books, London, ON
Adam Dickinson, The Polymers, Anansi, Toronto
Don Domanski, Bite Down Little Whisper, Brick Books, London, ON
Catherine Greenwood, The Lost Letters, Brick Books, London, ON
Phil Hall, The Small Nouns Crying Faith, BookThug, Toronto
Danny Jacobs, Songs That Remind Us of Factories, Nightwood Editions, Gibsons, BC
Niki Koulouris. The Sea with No One in it. Erin, ON: The Porcupine's Quill
Erín Moure, Pillage Laud: Cauterizations • Vocabularies • Cantigas • Topiary • Prose, BookThug, Toronto
Sara Peters, 1996, Anansi, Toronto
Shane Rhodes, X: Poems & Anti-Poems, Nightwood Editions, Gibsons, BC
Jacob Scheier, Letter from Brooklyn, ECW Press, Toronto

New Zealand
 Paula Green, The Baker's Thumbprint, Seraph Press
 Kate Camp, Snow White’s Coffin, Victoria University Press

Poets in Best New Zealand Poems
Poems from these 25 poets were selected by Ian Wedde for Best New Zealand Poems 2012, published online this year:

 Sarah Jane Barnett
 Tony Beyer
 James Brown
 Zarah Butcher-McGunnigle
 Kate Camp

 Geoff Cochrane
 Murray Edmond
 John Gallas
 Siobhan Harvey
 Helen Heath

 David Howard
 Andrew Johnston
 Anne Kennedy
 Aleksandra Lane
 Michele Leggott

 Frankie McMillan
 Gregory O'Brien
 Peter Olds
 Harry Ricketts
 Sam Sampson

 Kerrin P Sharpe
 C K Stead
 Richard von Sturmer
 Albert Wendt
 Ashleigh Young

United Kingdom
 Dannie Abse, Speak, Old Parrot, Hutchinson.
 John Agard, Travel Light Travel Dark, Bloodaxe Books, Tarset, England.
 Megan Beech, When I Grow Up I Want to be Mary Beard, Burning Eye Books.
 Emily Berry, Dear Boy, Faber.
 Julia Bird, Twenty-Four Seven Blossom, Salt.
 Rhian Edwards, Clueless Dogs, Welsh.
 Amy Key, Luxe, Salt Publishing, Cromer, England.
 Sinéad Morrissey, Parallax, Carcanet Press.
 Helen Mort, Division Street, Chatto & Windus, London, England.
 Heather Phillipson, Instant-Flex 718, Bloodaxe.
 David Nickle Read, Vespertine's Wander.
 Christopher Reid, Six Bad Poets, Faber.
 Michael Symmons Roberts, Drysalter, Jonathan Cape.
 Robin Robertson, Hill of Doors, Picador.
 Susanna Roxman, Crossing the North Sea, Dionysia Press, Edinburgh. This poetry collection is supported by Creative Scotland, formerly the Scottish Arts Council.
 Miles Salter, Animals, Valley Press, Scarborough, England.
 Claire Trévien, The Shipwrecked House, Penned in the Margins, London, England.

Anthologies in the United Kingdom
Carol Ann Duffy,  1914: Poetry Remembers (Faber & Faber) 
 Nathan Hamilton, editor. Dear World & Everyone In It (Bloodaxe Books) .

Criticism, scholarship and biography in the United Kingdom

United States

Carrie Olivia Adams, Forty-One Jane Doe's, Ahsahta Press, Boise (includes DVD w/three short films by Adams)
Rae Armantrout, Just Saying, Wesleyan University Press
Jennifer Atkinson, Canticle of the Night Path, Parlor Press, Anderson, South Carolina
Elizabeth Bachinsky, The Hottest Summer in Recorded History, Nightwood Editions.
Joshua Beckman, The Inside of an Apple, Wave Books, New York & Seattle
Dodie Bellamy, Cunt Norton, Les Figues Press, Los Angeles
Edmund Berrigan, Can It!, Letter Machine Editions
David Biespiel, Charming Gardeners, University of Washington Press
Robert Bly, Stealing Sugar from the Castle: Selected and New Poems, 1950 – 2013, Norton, New York / London
Charlie Bondhus, All the Heat We Could Carry, Main Street Rag
Ana Božičević, Rise in the Fall, Birds, LLC.
Joseph Ceravolo, Collected Poems, Wesleyan UP (Rosemary Ceravolo & Parker Smathers, editors)
Joel Chace, Kansoz, Knives Forks & Spoons Press, Newton-le-Willows, Merseyside, UK 
Dan Chelotti, X, McSweeney's, San Francisco
Clark Coolidge, Book Beginning What and Ending Away, Fence Books
Brad Cran, Ink on Paper, Nightwood Editions.
Michael Davidson,  Bleed Through: New and Selected Poems, Coffee House Books
Tishani Doshi, Everything Begins Elsewhere, Copper Canyon Press, Port Townsend
Marc DuCharme, The Unfinished: Books I-VI, BlazeVOX, Buffalo
Rachel Blau DuPlessis, Surge: Drafts 96 -114, Salt Publishing
Craig Dworkin Remotes, Little Red Leaves, Houston
Joshua Edwards,  Imperial N, Canarium Books.
Robert Fernandez, Pink Reef, Canarium Books.
Adam Fitzgerald, The Late Parade, WW Norton/Liveright
Nada Gordon, Vile Lilt, Roof, NYC
Noah Eli Gordon, The Year of the Rooster, Ahsahta Press
Michael Gottlieb, Dear All, Roof, NYC
Brian Henry, Brother No One, Salt Publishing
H. R. Hegnauer, Sir, Portable Press @ Yo-Yo Labs, Brooklyn
Bob Hicok, Elegy Owed, Copper Canyon Press
Ernest Hilbert, All of You on the Good Earth Red Hen Press, Los Angeles, CA
Nathan Hoks, The Narrow Circle, Penguin, NYC / London
Paul Killebrew, Ethical Consciousness, Canarium Books
Paul Klinger, Rubble Paper, Paper Rubble, Further Other BookWorks, Austin, Texas
Christopher Kondrich, Contrapuntal, Parlor Press, Anderson, South Carolina
Aaron Kunin, Grace Period: Notebooks, 1998–2007, Letter Machine Editions
Doug Lang, Dérangé, Primary Writing, Washington, D.C.
J. Vera Lee, Diary of Use, TinFish, Kane’ohe, HI
Paul Legault, The Emily Dickinson Reader: An English-to-English Translation of Emily Dickinson's Complete Poems, McSweeney's
Philip Levine, Sweet Will, Prairie Lights Books
Kimberly Lyons, The Practice of Residue, Subpress

Adrian Matejka -The Big Smoke, Penguin Books USA
Mary Meriam, Word Hot, Headmistress Press
W. S. Merwin, Selected Translations, Copper Canyon Press
Jay MillAr, Timely Irreverence, Nightwood Editions
Jane Miller, Thunderbird, Copper Canyon Press, Port Townsend, WA
Geoffrey G. O'Brien, People on Sunday, Wave Books, Seattle & New York
Lisa Olstein, Little Stranger, Copper Canyon, Port Townsend
Rochelle Owens, Out of Ur: New & Selected Poems, 1961 – 2012, Shearsman Books, Bristol, UK
George Quasha, Scorned Beauty Comes Up from Behind (preverbs), Between Editions, Barrytown, New York 
Shin Yu Pai, Aux Arx, La Alameda Press, Albuquerque, New Mexico
Holly Pester, Bark Leather, Veer Books, London
Ethel Rackin, The Forever Notes, Parlor Press, Anderson, South Carolina
Ray Ragota, A Motive for Disappearance, Burning Deck, Providence
Sandra Ridley, The Counting House, BookThug, Toronto
Jaime Robles, Hoard, Shearsman, Bristol, UK
Jerome Rothenberg, Eye of Witness: A Jerome Rothenberg Reader, edited with Heriberto Yépez, Black Widow Press, Boston
Claude Royet-Journoud, Four Elemental Bodies, translated from the French by Keith Waldrop, Burning Deck Press
Aidan Semmens, The Book of Isaac, Parlor Press, Anderson, South Carolina
Steve Shrader, The Arc of the Day / The Imperfectionist, TinFish, Kane’ohe, HI
Ron Silliman, Revelator, BookThug, Toronto, Canada
Ed Skoog, Rough Day, Copper Canyon, Port Townsend
Sampson Starkweather, The First 4 Books of Sampson Starkweather, Birds, LLC
Ed Steck, The Garden: Synthetic Environment for Analysis and Simulation, Ugly Duckling Presse, Brooklyn, 
Sarah Pemberton Strong, Tour of the Breath Gallery, introduction by Robert A Fink, Texas Tech University Press, Lubbock, Texas
Mark Tardi, Airport Music, Burning Deck, Providence, Rhode Island
Habib Tengour, Crossings, Post-Apollo Press, translated by Marilyn Hacker, Sausalito, California
Nayyirah Waheed, salt, self-published
Alli Warren, Here Come The Warm Jets, City Lights, San Francisco
Joshua Marie Wilkinson, Swamp Isthmus, Black Ocean
Kirby Wright, The Widow from Lake Bled, Moon Pie Press, Westbrook, Maine
Lynn Xu, Debts & Lessons, Omnidawn Publishing
David Yezzi, Birds of the Air, Carnegie Mellon University Press, Pittsburgh, Pennsylvania
Andrew Zawacki, Videotape, Counterpath, Denver

Anthologies in the United States
Lyn Hejinian & Barrett Watten, editors. A Guide to Poetics Journal: Writing in the Expanded Field, 1982 – 1998. (Wesleyan University Press, Middletown, Connecticut). Includes:  Steve Benson, Charles Bernstein, Beverly Dahlen, Alan Davies, Robert Glück, Susan Howe, George Lakoff, Jackson Mac Low, Viktor Shklovsky, Ron Silliman, Kathy Acker, Bruce Andrews, Rae Armantrout, Michael Davidson, Johanna Drucker, Carla Harryman, George Hartley, Bob Perelman, Kit Robinson, Nick Robinson, Leslie Scalapino, Peter Seaton, Warren Sonbert, Pierre Alferi, Dodie Bellamy, Arkadii Dragomoshchenko, Jerry Estrin, Harryette Mullen, Ted Pearson, Andrew Ross, Lorenzo Thomas, Reva Wolf, John Zorn
Pierre Joris (Editor), Habib Tengour, editor. Poems for the Millennium, Volume Four: The University of California Book of North African Literature
Glenn O'Brien, editor. The Cool School: Writing from America's Hip Underground, Library of America. Includes: Mezz Mezzerow, Miles Davis, Henry Miller, Babs Gonzales, Art Pepper, Neal Cassady, Delmore Schwartz, Terry Southern, Annie Ross, Lord Buckley, Diane di Prima, Jack Kerouac, Frank O’Hara, LeRoi Jones, Lenny Bruce, Mort Sahl, Bob Dylan, William S Burroughs, Ishmael Reed, Andy Warhol, Nick Tosches, Hunter S Thompson, Iris Owens, Lester Bangs, Gary Indiana, Richard Prince, Emily XYZ, Eric Bogosian, George Carlin
 George Quasha & Jerome Rothenberg, (eds.) America a Prophecy: A New Reading of American Poetry from Pre-Columbian Times to the Present (Station Hill Archive Editions)
TC Tolbert and Tim Trace Peterson, editors. Troubling the Line: Trans and Genderqueer Poetry and Poetics, Nightboat Books.  Poets include Samuel Ace, Julian Talamantez Brolaski, Micha Cárdenas, kari edwards, Duriel Harris, Joy Ladin, Dawn Lundy Martin, Eileen Myles, Trish Salah, Max Wolf Valerio, John Wieners, Kit Yan, Zoe Tuck
Susan M. Schultz, editor. Jack London Is Dead: Contemporary Euro-American Poetry of Hawai'i (and Some Stories), Tinfish Press.-Contributors: Scott Abels, Diana Aehegma, Margo Berdeshevsky, Jim Chapson, M. Thomas Gammarino, Shantel Grace, Jaimie Gusman, Endi Bogue Hartigan, Anne Kennedy, Tyler McMahon, Evan Nagle, Janna Plant, Susan M. Schultz, Eric Paul Schaffer, Julia Wieting, Rob Wilson, and Meg Withers

Criticism, scholarship and biography in the United States
 Robert Archambeau. The Poet Resigns: Poetry in a Difficult World

Poets in The Best American Poetry 2013
The following poets appeared in The Best American Poetry 2013. David Lehman, general editor, and Denise Duhamel, guest editor (who selected the poetry):

Kim Addonizio
Sherman Alexie
Nathan Athanderson
Nin Andrews
John Ashbery
Wendy Barker
Jan Beatty
Bruce Bond
Traci Brimhall
Jericho Brown
Andrei Codrescu
Billy Collins
Martha Collins
Kwame Dawes
Connie Deanovich
Timothy Donnelly
Stephen Dunn
Daisy Fried
Amy Gerstler
Louise Glück
Beckian Fritz Goldberg
Terrance Hayes
Rebecca Hazelton
Elizabeth Hazen
John Hennessy
David Hernandez

Tony Hoagland
Anna Maria Hong
Major Jackson
Mark Jarman
Lauren Jensen
A. Van Jordan
Lawrence Joseph
Anna Journey
Laura Kasischke
Victoria Kelly
David Kirby
Noelle Kocot
John Koethe
Dorothea Lasky
Dorianne Laux
Amy Lawless
Amy Lemmon
Thomas Lux
Anthony Madrid
Sally Wen Mao
Jen McClanaghan
Campbell McGrath
Jesse Millner
D. Nurske
Ed Ochester

Paisley Rekdal
Adrienne Rich
Anne Marie Roonie
J. Allyn Rosser
Mary Ruefle
Maureen Seaton
Tom Seibles
Vijay Seshadri
Peter Jay Shippy
Mitch Sisskind
Aaron Smith
Stephanie Strickland
Adrienne Su
James Tate
Emma Trelles 
David Trinidad
Jean Valentine
Paul Violi
David Wagoner
Stacey Waite
Richard Wilbur
Angela Veronica Wong
Wendy Xu
Kevin Young
Matthew Zapruder

Works published in English in other countries
Myint Myint Khin, Poetry for Me, Burmese medical consultant writing in English

Works published in other languages
Antony Theodore, Im Schatten deiner Schwingen ich suche Zufluct, German pastor, educator and poet
Gillo Dorfles, Poesie, Italian art critic, painter and philosopher
Michel Houellebecq, Configuration du dernier rivage, French poet
Christine James, Rhwng y Llinellau, Welsh poet published in the United Kingdom

Awards and honors by country

Awards announced this year:

Canada awards and honours
 Archibald Lampman Award: Nina Berkhout, Elseworlds
 Atlantic Poetry Prize: Lesley Choyce, I'm Alive. I Believe in Everything
 2013 Governor General's Awards: Katherena Vermette, North End Love Songs (English); René Lapierre, Pour les désespérés seulement (French)
 Griffin Poetry Prize:
Canadian: David McFadden, What's the Score?
International, in the English Language: Ghassan Zaqtan translated by Fady Joudah, The Straw Bird It Follows Me, and Other Poems
 Gerald Lampert Award: Gillian Savigny, Notebook M
 Pat Lowther Award: Rachel Rose, Song and Spectacle
 Prix Alain-Grandbois: René Lapierre, Pour les désespérés seulement
 Raymond Souster Award: A. F. Moritz, The New Measures
 Dorothy Livesay Poetry Prize: Sarah de Leeuw, Geographies of a Lover
 Prix Émile-Nelligan: Michaël Trahan, Nœud coulant

France awards and honors
Prix Goncourt de la Poésie:

India
 Sahitya Akademi Award : Chandrakant Devtale for Patthar Fenk Raha Hoon
 Poetry Society India National Poetry Competition : Mathew John for Another Letter from Another Father to Another Son & Tapan Kumar Pradhan for The Buddha Smiled

New Zealand awards and honors
 New Zealand Post Book Awards:
 Poetry Award winner: Anne Kennedy, The Darling North. Auckland University Press
 NZSA Jessie Mackay Best First Book Award for Poetry: Helen Heath, Graft. Victoria University Press

United Kingdom awards and honors
 Cholmondeley Award: Simon Armitage, Paul Farley, Lee Harwood, Medbh McGuckian
 Costa Award (formerly "Whitbread Awards") for poetry:
 Shortlist:
 English Association's Fellows' Poetry Prizes:
 Eric Gregory Award (for a collection of poems by a poet under the age of 30):
 Forward Poetry Prize:
Best Collection: Michael Symmons Roberts, Drysalter (Cape Poetry)
Shortlist:
Best First Collection:
Shortlist:
Best Poem: Nick MacKinnon, The Metric System
Shortlist:
 Jerwood Aldeburgh First Collection Prize for poetry:
Shortlist:
 Manchester Poetry Prize:
 National Poet of Wales:
 National Poetry Competition : Linda France for Bernard and Cerinthe
 T. S. Eliot Prize: Sinead Morrissey for Parallax
Shortlist (announced in November 2013): 2013 Short List
 The Times/Stephen Spender Prize for Poetry Translation:

United States awards and honors
 Agnes Lynch Starrett Poetry Prize: Sarah Rose Nordgren for Best Bones 
 * AML Award for Poetry awarded Alex Caldiero for sonosuono (with recognition also to Susan Elizabeth Howe's collection Salt and Lance Larsen's collection Genius Loci
 Best Translated Book Award (BTBA) – Poetry Finalists for 2013 BTBA (see note) 

 Bollingen Prize: Charles Wright – Judges: Susan Howe; Geoffrey O'Brien; Joan Richardson
 Jackson Poetry Prize: – Arthur Sze
  Kinereth Gensler Award from Alice James Books: Cecily Parks for O’Nights
 Kingsley Tufts Poetry Award: Marianne Boruch of West Lafayette, Indiana, for her collection The Book of Hours
 The Kundiman Poetry Prize from Alice James Books and Kundiman: Lo Kwa Mei-en for Yearling
 Lambda Literary Award:
 Gay Poetry: Stephen S. Mills, He Do the Gay Man in Different Voices
 Lesbian Poetry: Etel Adnan, Sea and Fog
 Lenore Marshall Poetry Prize:
 National Book Award for Poetry: Mary Szybist for Incarnadine  (Graywolf Press)
Finalists: Frank Bidart, Metaphysical Dog (Farrar, Straus and Giroux); Lucie Brock-Broido, Stay, Illusion (Alfred A. Knopf); Adrian Matejka, The Big Smoke (Penguin Poets/Penguin Group USA); Matt Rasmussen, Black Aperture (Louisiana State University Press) 
Longlist: – Roger Bonair-Agard, Bury My Clothes (Haymarket Books) ; – Andrei Codrescu, So Recently Rent a World, New and Selected Poems: 1968–2012 (Coffee House Press); – Brenda Hillman, Seasonal Works with Letters on Fire (Wesleyan University Press) ; – Diane Raptosh, American Amnesiac (Etruscan Press) ; – Martha Ronk, Transfer of Qualities (Omnidawn Publishing)
Judges: Nikky Finney, Ada Limón, D. A. Powell, Jahan Ramazani, Craig Morgan Teicher
 National Book Critics Circle Award for Poetry: Frank Bidart for Metaphysical Dog 
 The New Criterion Poetry Prize: Dick Allen for  This Shadowy Place; Judges: Debora Greger, David Yezzi, Roger Kimball
 PEN Award for Poetry in Translation: Molly Weigel for The Shock of the Lenders and Other Poems by Jorge Santiago Perednik
 Prairie Schooner Book Prize in Poetry: R. A. Villanueva for Reliquaria
 Pulitzer Prize for Poetry (United States): Sharon Olds for "Stag's Leap"; Jury: Carl Phillips, Maurice Manning, C.D. Wright.
Finalists: Jack Gilbert for Collected Poems and Bruce Weigl for "The Abundance of Nothing".
 Raiziss/de Palchi Translation Award: John Taylor for Selected Poems by Lorenzo Calogero
 Ruth Lilly Poetry Prize : Marie Ponsot
 Wallace Stevens Award: Philip Levine
 Walt Whitman Prize – Chris Hosea for Put Your Hands In ;            – Judge: John Ashbery
 Whiting Awards: Ishion Hutchinson, Rowan Ricardo Phillips
 Yale Younger Series: Eryn Green for his collection, Eruv – Judge: Carl Phillips

From the Poetry Society of America
 Frost Medal: Robert Bly
 Shelley Memorial Award: Lucia Perillo / Martín Espada    –  Judges: Amy Gerstler & Marilyn Nelson
 Writer Magazine/Emily Dickinson Award: Greg Wrenn; Finalists:  Heather Cousins / Jacquelyn Pope  – Judge: Brian Teare
 Lyric Poetry Award: Micah Bateman; Finalists: Bruce Bond /  Andrea Carter Brown – Judge: Carolyne Wright
 Lucille Medwick Memorial Award: Gary Young; Finalists: Bruce Bond / Diana Khoi Nguyen  –  Judge: Patricia Smith
 Alice Fay Di Castagnola Award: Elyse Fenton; Finalists: Meena Alexander / Lia Purpura  – Judge: Kevin Prufer                 
 Louise Louis/Emily F. Bourne Student Poetry Award: Lizza Rodriguez; Finalists: Sarah George / Jack Hunt  – Judge: Gabrielle Calvocoressi
 George Bogin Memorial Award: Paula Bohince; Finalists: Jamaal May / Lucy Ricciardi  –  Judge: Cate Marvin
 Robert H. Winner Memorial Award: Carol Light Finalist: C. E. Perry –  Judge: David Wagoner         
 Cecil Hemley Memorial Award: Ted Mathys     –         Judge: Alice Notley
 Norma Farber First Book Award: Nick Twemlow for Palm Trees (Green Lantern Press, 2012); – Judge: Timothy Liu
'Finalist: Robert Ostrom for The Youngest Butcher in Illinois (YesYes Books, 2012) 
 William Carlos Williams Award: Naomi Replansky for Collected Poems (Black Sparrow|David R. Godine) –  Judge: B. H. Fairchild 
Finalists for WCW Award: Kathleen Flenniken for Plume; Lucia Perillo for On The Spectrum of Possible Deaths; and Patrica Smith for Shoulda Been Jimi Savannah

Deaths
Birth years link to the corresponding "[year] in poetry" article:
January 10 – Evan S. Connell, Jr., 88 (born 1924) American novelist, poet and short-story writer.
January 20 – Toyo Shibata, 101 (born 1911), female Japanese poet.
January 29 – Anselm Hollo, 78 (born 1934), Finnish poet resident in the U.S. since 1967.
January 24 – Lucien Stryk, 88 (born 1924) American poet, Zen scholar and translator.
March 2 – Thomas McEvilley, 73 (born 1939), American art critic, poet and novelist.
March 21 – Chinua Achebe, 82 (born 1930), Nigerian writer, perhaps best known for Things Fall Apart, also published many volumes of poetry, including his Collected Poems in 2005.
March 30 – Daniel Hoffman, 89 (born 1923), Poet Laureate of the U.S. in 1973 and 1974.
 May 5 – Sarah Kirsch, 78 (born 1935), East German poet.
 August 17 – John Hollander, 83 (born 1929), American poet and literary critic.
 August 30 – Seamus Heaney, 74 (born 1939), Irish poet, playwright, translator and critic, winner of the 1995 Nobel Prize in Literature.
 September 23 – Álvaro Mutis, 90 (born 1923), Colombian poet, novelist and essayist.

See also

Poetry
List of poetry awards

References

2010s in poetry
2013 poems